This is a list of Jewish film directors. The countries listed are those where films were directed.

Award winning director to add-
Kevin Asch US

A
Jim Abrahams (born 1944), US
J. J. Abrams (born 1966), US
Ivan Abramson (born 1869), US
Lenny Abrahamson (born 1966), Ireland, UK
Michael Addis, US
Alexandre Aja (born 1978), France
Chantal Akerman (born 1950), Belgium
Corey Allen (1934–2010), US
Woody Allen (born 1935), US
Mathieu Amalric (born 1965), France
Broncho Billy Anderson (born 1880), US
Eleanor Antin (born 1935), US
Judd Apatow (born 1968), US
Alexandre Arcady (born 1947), France
Alan Arkin (born 1934), US
Darren Aronofsky (born 1969), US
David Arquette (born 1971), US
Kevin Asch (born 1975), US
Olivier Assayas (born 1955), France
Ari Aster (born 1987/1988), US, Sweden
Yvan Attal (born 1965), France
Paul Auster (born 1947), US
Jon Avnet (born 1949), US
George Axelrod (1922–2003), US

B
Héctor Babenco (born 1946), Brazil, US
Ralph Bakshi (born 1938), US
Bob Balaban (born 1945), US
Uri Barbash, Israel
Amir Bar-Lev (born 1972), US
Boris Barnet (born 1902), USSR
Daniel Barnz (born 1970), US
Noah Baumbach (born 1969), US
Michael Bay (born 1965), US
Henry Bean (born 1945), US
Jack Bender (born 1949), US
László Benedek (born 1905), US, Germany, France
Richard Benjamin (born 1938), US
Jean Benoît-Lévy (born 1888), France 
Robby Benson (born 1956), US
Andrew Bergman (born 1945), US
Alan Berliner (born 1956), US
Andrea Berloff (born 1974), US
Raymond Bernard (born 1891), France
Curtis Bernhardt (born 1899), Germany, France, UK, US
Assaf Bernstein (born 1970), Israel
Claude Berri (born 1934), France
John Berry (born 1917), US, France
Herbert Biberman (born 1900), US
Susanne Bier (born 1960), Denmark, Sweden, UK, US
Mike Binder (born 1958), US
Peter Bogdanovich (born 1939), US
Michel Boujenah (born 1952), France
Zach Braff (born 1975), US
John Brahm (born 1893), UK, US, Italy, Germany
Martin Brest (born 1951), US
Marshall Brickman (born 1939), US
Albert Brooks (born 1947), US
James L. Brooks (born 1940), US
Mel Brooks (born 1926), US
Richard Brooks (born 1912), US
Daniel Burman (born 1973), Argentina

C
Dyan Cannon (born 1937), US
William Castle (born 1914), US
Gilbert Cates (1934), US
Joseph Cedar (born 1968), Israel
Alain Chabat (born 1958), France
Lionel Chetwynd (born 1940), US
Lisa Cholodenko (born 1964), US
Joyce Chopra (born 1936), US
Grigory Chukhray (born 1921), USSR
Elie Chouraqui (born 1953), France
Shirley Clarke (born 1919), US
Larry Cohen (born 1941), US
Joel Coen (born 1954) and Ethan Coen (born 1957), US
Rob Cohen (born 1949), US
Hubert Cornfield (born 1929), Turkey
Brandon Cronenberg (born 1980), Canada
David Cronenberg (born 1943), Canada
George Cukor (born 1899), US
Michael Curtiz (born 1886), US, Hungary
Paul Czinner (born 1890), Austria, Germany, UK

D
Jules Dassin (1911–2008), US, France
Maya Deren (1917–1961), US
Cecil B. DeMille (1881–1959), US
Howard Deutch (1950–), US
Stanley Donen (1924–2019), US
Mark Donskoy (1901–1981), USSR
Richard Donner (1930–2021), US
Robert Downey, Sr. (1935–2021), US
Michel Drach (born 1930), France
Lena Dunham (born 1986), US

E
Judit Elek (born 1937), Hungary
Gad Elmaleh (born 1971), France
Morris Engel (born 1918), US
Nora Ephron (born 1941), US
Jean Epstein (born 1897), France
Marie Epstein (born 1899), France
Fridrikh Ermler (born 1898), USSR

F
Jon Favreau (born 1966), US
Dave Fleischer (born 1894), US
Max Fleischer (born 1883), US
Richard Fleischer (born 1916), US
Ruben Fleischer (born 1974), US
Ari Folman (born 1962), Israel
Aleksander Ford (born 1908), Poland
Péter Forgács (born 1950), Hungary
James Franco (born 1978), US
Robert Frank (born 1924), US
Friz Freleng (born 1906), US
Sami Frey (born 1937), France
William Friedkin (born 1935), US
Samuel Fuller (born 1911), US

G

Béla Gaál (born 1893), Hungary
Jack Garfein (born 1930), US
Gyula Gazdag (born 1947), Hungary, US
Aleksei Yuryevich German (born 1938), USSR, Russia
Kurt Gerron (born 1897), Germany
Viktor Gertler (born 1901), Hungary
Amos Gitai (born 1950), Israel
Jonathan Glazer (born 1965), UK
Jack Gold (born 1930), UK
Evan Goldberg (born 1982), US
Marina Goldovskaya (born 1941), USSR, US, Russia
Keith Gordon (born 1961), US
Michael Gordon (born 1909), US
Debra Granik (born 1963), US
James Gray (born 1969), US
Joseph Green (born 1900), US
Bud Greenspan (born 1926), US
Maggie Greenwald (born 1955), US
Robert Greenwald (born 1943), US
Christopher Guest (born 1948), US
Charles Guggenheim (born 1924), US
Davis Guggenheim (born 1963), US

H
Hugo Haas (born 1901), Czechoslovakia
Roger Hanin (born 1925), France
Todd Haynes (born 1961), US
Michel Hazanavicius (born 1967), France
Amy Heckerling (born 1954), US
János Herskó (born 1926), Hungary
Marshall Herskovitz (born 1952), US
Aleksander Hertz (born 1879), Poland
Juraj Herz (born 1934), Czechoslovakia
John Herzfeld, US
Grant Heslov (born 1963), US
Arthur Hiller (born 1923), US
Jerzy Hoffman (born 1932), Poland
Agnieszka Holland (born 1948), Poland, West Germany, France, UK, US
Nicole Holofcener (born 1960), US
Peter Hyams (born 1943), US

J
Stanley R. Jaffe (born 1940), US
Henry Jaglom (born 1938), US
Agnès Jaoui (born 1964), France
Andrew Jarecki (born 1960), US
Eugene Jarecki (born 1964), US
Alejandro Jodorowsky (born 1929), France, Mexico, US, UK, Chile
Ján Kadár (born 1918), Slovakia, Czech Republic, US, Canada, Ramakrishna U, India

K
Jeremy Paul Kagan (born 1945), US
Garson Kanin (born 1912), US
Charlie Kaufman (born 1958), US
George S. Kaufman (born 1889), US
Lloyd Kaufman (born 1945), US
Moises Kaufman (born 1963), US
Tony Kaye (director) (born 1952), US
Jake Kasdan (born 1975), US
Lawrence Kasdan (born 1949), US
Peter Kassovitz (born 1938), France, Hungary
Aviva Kempner (born 1946), US
Irvin Kershner (born 1923), US
Iosif Kheifits (born 1905), USSR
Beeban Kidron (born 1961), UK, US
Zalman King (born 1942), US
Dimitri Kirsanoff (1899–1957), Estonia, France
Cédric Klapisch (born 1961), France
William Klein (born 1928), France
Jan Jakub Kolski (born 1956), Poland
Alexander Korda (born 1893), UK, Hungary
Zoltan Korda (born 1895), UK, Hungary
Harmony Korine (born 1973), US
Henry Koster (born 1905), US
Grigori Kozintsev (born 1905), USSR
Stanley Kramer (born 1913), US
Stanley Kubrick (born 1925), US, UK

L
John Landis (born 1950), US
Fritz Lang (born 1890), on his mother's side
Claude Lanzmann (1925 – 2018), France
Marc Lawrence (1910 – 2005), US
Mélanie Laurent (born 1983), France
Mimi Leder (born 1952), US
Mike Leigh (born 1943), UK
Paul Lieberstein (born 1967), US
Claude Lelouch (born 1937), France
Paul Leni (born 1885), Germany, US
Mervyn LeRoy (born 1900), US
Jonathan Levine (born 1976), US
Barry Levinson (born 1942), US
Dani Levy (born 1957), Switzerland
Eugene Levy (born 1946) USA
Shawn Levy (born 1967), US
Albert Lewin (born 1894), US
Ben Lewin (born 1946), Australia, UK, France, US
Jerry Lewis (born 1925), US
Joseph H. Lewis (born 1907), US
Sébastien Lifshitz (born 1968), France
Peter Lilienthal (born 1929), Germany
Doug Liman (born 1965), US
Lynne Littman (born 1941), US
Anatole Litvak (born 1902), Germany, France, US
Mike Yechiel Lichtman (born 1981) USA
Jennie Livingston (born 1962), US
Arthur Lubin (born 1898), US
Ernst Lubitsch (born 1894), US, Germany
Michael Lucas (born 1972), US
Sidney Lumet (born 1924), US
Rod Lurie (born 1962), US
Henry Lynn (born 1895), US

M
Norman Mailer (born 1923) USA
Clara Mamet (born 1994), US
David Mamet (born 1947), US
James Mangold (born 1963), US
Joseph L. Mankiewicz (born 1909), US
Daniel Mann (born 1912), US
Michael Mann (born 1943), US
Andrew Marton (born 1904), Austria, Germany, US, UK, Hungary
Rudolph Maté (born 1898), US
Melina Matsoukas (born 1981), US
Elaine May (born 1932), US
Paul Mazursky (born 1930), US
Jean-Pierre Melville (born 1917), France
Sam Mendes (born 1965), US, UK
Nicholas Meyer (born 1945), US
Nancy Meyers (born 1949), US
Radu Mihăileanu (born 1958), France, Romania
Lewis Milestone (born 1895), US
Bennett Miller (born 1966), US
Claude Miller (born 1942), France
Michel Mitrani (born 1930), France
Moshé Mizrahi (born 1931), Israel, France
Serge Moati (born 1958), France, Tunisia
Meredith Monk (born 1942), US
Janusz Morgenstern (born 1922), Poland
Errol Morris (born 1948), US
Oren Moverman (born 1966), US
Andrzej Munk (born 1921), Poland

N
Tim Blake Nelson (born 1964), US
Sam Newfield (born 1899), US
Avi Nesher (born 1952), Israel
Mike Nichols (born 1931), US
Leonard Nimoy (born 1931), US
Yuriy Norshteyn (born 1941), USSR, Russia

O
Ken Olin (born 1954), US
Marcel Ophuls (born 1927), France, West Germany, US
Max Ophüls (born 1902) Germany, France, US
Gérard Oury (born 1919), France
Frank Oz (born 1944), US

P
Alan J. Pakula (born 1928), US
Stacie Passon (born 1969), US
Joe Pasternak (born 1901), US
Larry Peerce (born 1930), US
Arthur Penn (born 1922), US
Leo Penn (born 1921), US
Vadim Perelman (born 1963), US
Alex Ross Perry (born 1984), US
Irving Pichel (born 1891), US, Germany
Lupu Pick (born 1886), Germany
Roman Polanski (born 1933), France, Poland, US
Stephen Poliakoff (born 1952), UK
Sydney Pollack (born 1934), US
Abraham Polonsky (born 1910), US
Gabe Polsky (born 1979), US
Gillo Pontecorvo (born 1919), Italy
Natalie Portman (born 1981), US
Ted Post (born 1918), US
Otto Preminger (born 1906), US
Emeric Pressburger (born 1902), UK

R
Alfred Radok (born 1917), Czechoslovakia
Bob Rafelson (born 1933), US
Sam Raimi (born 1959), US
Yuli Raizman (born 1903), USSR
Harold Ramis (born 1944), US
Irving Rapper (born 1888), US
Brett Ratner (born 1969), US
Gregory Ratoff (born 1893), US
Pierre Rehov, France
Carl Reiner (born 1922), US
Rob Reiner (born 1947), US
Ivan Reitman (born 1946), Canada, US
Jason Reitman (born 1977), US
Boots Riley (born 1971), US
Martin Ritt (born 1914), US
Lilly Rivlin (born 1936), Israel, US
Jay Roach (born 1957), US
Brian Robbins (born 1963), US
Lauren Miller Rogen (born 1982), US
Seth Rogen (born 1982), US
Mikhail Romm (born 1901), USSR
Abram Room (born 1894), USSR
Stuart Rosenberg (born 1927), US
Robert Rossen (born 1908), US
Eli Roth (born 1972), US
Stephanie Rothman (born 1936), US
Jan Rybkowski (born 1912), Poland

S
Fred Savage (born 1976), US
Akiva Schaffer (born 1977), US
Jerry Schatzberg (born 1927), US
Suzanne Schiffman (born 1929), France
John Schlesinger (born 1926), UK, US
Julian Schnabel (born 1951), US
David Schwimmer (born 1966), US
Susan Seidelman (born 1952), US
Steve Sekely (born 1899), Germany, Hungary, US, UK, Italy
Joann Sfar (born 1971), France
Vincent Sherman (born 1906), US
Cate Shortland (born 1968), Australia
Esfir Shub (born 1894), USSR
Don Siegel (born 1912), US
Joan Micklin Silver (born 1935), US
Bryan Singer (born 1965), US
Curt Siodmak (born 1902), US, Germany
Robert Siodmak (born 1900), US, Germany
Todd Solondz (born 1959), US
Barry Sonnenfeld (born 1953), US
Aaron Sorkin (born 1961), US
Steven Spielberg (born 1946), US
Nicole Stéphane (born 1923), France
Ben Stiller (born 1965), US
Todd Strauss-Schulson (born 1980), US
Barbra Streisand (born 1942), US
Steve Suissa (born 1970), France
István Szabó (born 1938), Hungary, Germany
Henryk Szaro (born 1900), Poland
Samy Szlingerbaum (born 1950), Belgium

T
Danièle Thompson (born 1942), France
Konrad Tom (born 1887), Poland
Leonid Trauberg (born 1902), USSR
Slava Tsukerman (born 1940), Russia
Jon Turteltaub (born 1963), US

U
Alexei Uchitel (born 1951), Russia

V
Francis Veber (born 1937), France
Dziga Vertov (born 1896), USSR
Charles Vidor (born 1900), US
Jordan Vogt-Roberts (born 1984), US
Josef von Sternberg (born 1894), US, Austria
Erich von Stroheim (born 1885), US, France, Austria

W
David Wain (born 1969), US
Taika Waititi (born 1975), New Zealand, US 
Sam Wanamaker (born 1919), US, UK
Robin Washington (born 1956), US
Michał Waszyński (born 1904), Poland, Italy
Claudia Weill (born 1947), US
Matthew Weiner (born 1965), US
Leilah Weinraub (born 1979), US
Jiří Weiss (born 1913), Czechoslovakia, West Germany, Czech Republic
Billy Wilder (born 1906), US, France
Irwin Winkler (born 1931), US
Frederick Wiseman (born 1930), US, France
William Wyler (born 1902), US

Y
Boaz Yakin (born 1966), US
Linda Yellen (born 1949), US
Sergei Yutkevich (born 1904), USSR
Yolande Zauberman, France

Z
Fred Zinnemann (born 1907), US, Germany
David Zucker & Jerry Zucker (born 1950), US
Edward Zwick (born 1952), US

References

Further reading
Berger, A. L., "A New Generation of Jewish Writers and Filmmakers," in Berger, (1997). Children of Job: American Second-Generation Witnesses to the Holocaust. Albany, N.Y: State University of New York Press.
Brook, V. (2009). Driven to Darkness: Jewish Emigre Directors and the Rise of Film Noir. Piscataway: Rutgers University Press.
Desser, D., & Friedman, L. D. (2004). American Jewish Filmmakers. Urbana: University of Illinois Press. .
Lebow, A. (2008). First Person Jewish. Minneapolis: University of Minnesota Press.
Stanfield, P. "A Monarch for the Millions: Jewish Filmmakers, Social Commentary, and the Postwar Cycle of Boxing Films." (2007). Frank Krutnik, ed. Un-American" Hollywood: Politics and Film in the Blacklist Era. New Brunswick: Rutgers University Press.

Jewish
Film directors